In music, montage (literally "putting together") or sound collage ("gluing together") is a technique where newly branded sound objects or compositions, including songs, are created from collage, also known as montage. This is often done through the use of sampling, while some playable sound collages were produced by gluing together sectors of different vinyl records. In any case, it may be achieved through the use of previous sound recordings or musical scores. Like its visual cousin, the collage work may have a completely different effect than that of the component parts, even if the original parts are completely recognizable or from only one source.

History
The origin of sound collage can be traced back to the works of Biber's programmatic sonata Battalia (1673) and Mozart's Don Giovanni (1789), and some critics have described certain passages in Mahler symphonies as collage, but the first fully developed collages occur in a few works by Charles Ives, whose piece Central Park in the Dark, composed in 1906, creates the feeling of a walk in the city by layering several distinct melodies and quotations on top of each other. Thus, the use of collage in music actually predates its use in painting by artists like Picasso and Braque, who are generally credited with creating the first collage paintings around 1912.

Earlier traditional forms and procedures such as the quodlibet, medley, potpourri, and centonization differ from collage in that the various elements in them are made to fit smoothly together, whereas in a collage clashes of key, timbre, texture, meter, tempo, or other discrepancies are important in helping to preserve the individuality of the constituent elements and to convey the impression of a heterogeneous assemblage. What made their technique true collage, however, was the juxtaposition of quotations and unrelated melodies, either by layering them or by moving between them in quick succession, as in a film montage sequence.

The first documented instance of sound collage created by electronic means is the piece "Wochenende" (in English, "Weekend"), a collage of words, music and sounds created by film-maker and media artist Walter Ruttmann in 1928. Later, in 1948, Pierre Schaeffer used the techniques of sound collage to create the first piece of musique concrète, "Étude aux chemins de fer", which was assembled from recordings of trains. Schaeffer created this piece by recording sounds of trains onto several vinyl records, some of which had lock grooves allowing them to play in a continuous loop. He then set up multiple turntables in his studio, allowing him to trigger and mix together the various train sounds as needed.

Today audio collage may be thought of as Fluxus postmodern and a form of digital art. George Rochberg is a composer well-known for his use of collage in pieces including Contra Mortem et Tempus and Symphony No. 3. According to music theorist Cristina Losada, the third movement of Luciano Berio's Sinfonia is often considered "the prototype of a musical collage."

Micromontage
Micromontage is the use of montage on the time scale of microsounds. Its primary proponent is composer Horacio Vaggione in works such as Octuor (1982), Thema (1985, Wergo 2026-2), and Schall (1995, Mnémosyne Musique Média LDC 278–1102). The technique may include the extraction and arrangement of sound particles from a sample or the creation and exact placement of each particle to create complex sound patterns or singular particles (transients). It may be accomplished through graphic editing, a script, or automated through a computer program.

Regardless, digital micromontage requires:
creation or compilation of a library of sound files on several different time scales
importation into the library of the editing and mixing program
use of the cursor, script, or algorithm to position each sound at a specific time-point or time-points
editing of the duration, amplitude, and spatial positions of all sounds (possibly done by a script or algorithm)

Granular synthesis incorporates many of the techniques of micromontage, though granular synthesis is inevitably automated while micromontage may be realized directly, point by point. "It therefore demands unusual patience" and may be compared to the pointillistic paintings of Georges Seurat.

See also
 Musique concrète
 Detournement
 Mashup
 Remix
 Revolution 9
 Sampling (music)
 Some Assembly Required (radio program)
 WhoSampled
 Plunderphonics
 :Category:Sound collage albums

Sources

Further reading
 Joline Blais, and Jon Ippolito. At the Edge of Art. London: Thames & Hudson Ltd, 2006.
 Buci-Glucksmann, Christine. "L’art à l’époque virtuel". In Frontières esthétiques de l’art, Arts 8, . Paris: L’Harmattan, 2004.
 Couchot, Edmond. Des Images, du temps et des machines, dans les arts et la communication. [Nîmes]: J. Chambon, 2007. .
 Forest, Fred. Art et Internet. Paris: Editions Cercle D'Art / Imaginaire Mode d'Emploi, 2008. .
 Liu, Alan. The Laws of Cool: Knowledge, Work, and the Culture of Information. Chicago: University of Chicago Press, 2004.
 Lovejoy, Margot. Digital Currents: Art in the Electronic Age. London: Routledge, 2004.
 Paul, Christiane. Digital Art. London and New York: Thames & Hudson Ltd, 2003. .
 Popper, Frank. From Technological to Virtual Art. Leonardo (Series). Cambridge: MIT Press, 2007. .
 Taylor, Brandon. Collage. London: Thames & Hudson Ltd, 2006.
 Wands, Bruce. Art of the Digital Age. London and New York: Thames & Hudson, 2006.  (hbk.),  (pbk.)

 Sound
Electronic music
Modernism (music)
Musical techniques
Sound
Cassette culture 1970s–1990s
Sampling (music)